Barringtonia pendula grows as a tree up to  tall, with a trunk diameter of up to . The bark is reddish brown. The specific epithet pendula is from the Latin meaning "dangling", referring to the inflorescence. Its habitat is dipterocarp forest from sea-level to  altitude. B. pendula is found in China, Burma, Thailand, Sumatra, Peninsular Malaysia and Borneo.

References

pendula
Trees of China
Trees of Myanmar
Trees of Thailand
Trees of Sumatra
Trees of Peninsular Malaysia
Trees of Borneo
Plants described in 1854